

Sir John Frank Charles Kingman  (born 28 August 1939) is a British mathematician. He served as N. M. Rothschild and Sons Professor of Mathematical Sciences and Director of the Isaac Newton Institute at the University of Cambridge from 2001 until 2006, when he was succeeded by David Wallace. He is known for developing the mathematics of the Coalescent theory, a theoretical model of inheritance, which is fundamental to modern population genetics.

Education and early life
The grandson of a coal miner and son of a government scientist with a PhD in chemistry, Kingman was born in Beckenham, Kent, and grew up in the outskirts of London, where he attended Christ's College, Finchley, which was then a state grammar school. He was awarded a scholarship to read mathematics at Pembroke College, Cambridge, in 1956. On graduating in 1960, he began work on his PhD under the supervision of Peter Whittle, studying queueing theory, Markov chains and regenerative phenomena.

Career and research
Whittle left Cambridge for the University of Manchester, and, rather than follow him there, Kingman moved instead to the University of Oxford, where he resumed his work under David Kendall. After another year, Kendall was appointed a professor at Cambridge and so Kingman returned to Cambridge. He returned, however, as a member of the teaching staff (and a Fellow of Pembroke College) and never completed his PhD. He married Valerie Crompton, a historian at the University of Sussex in 1964, and in 1965 he took up the post of Reader at the newly built University of Sussex where she was teaching, and was elected Professor of Mathematics and Statistics after only a year. He said of this post: 
Sussex in the 1960s was a very exciting place, alive with ideas and opportunities. My wife was teaching history there, and we made many friends across the whole range of subjects.  
He held this post until 1969, when he moved, figuratively, but not physically, to Oxford as Wallis Professor of Mathematics, a position he held until 1985. He has said of this appointment:
Statistics in Oxford in 1969 was frankly a mess. There was no professor of statistics, the only chair having been abolished some years before...[Maurice Bartlett and] I conspired to persuade Oxford to take statistics seriously.

During his time at Oxford, as well as holding a Fellowship at St Anne's College from 1978 to 1985, Kingman also chaired the Science and Engineering Research Council (now the Engineering and Physical Sciences Research Council (EPSRC)) from 1981 to 1985, was vice-president of the Institute of Statisticians from 1978 until 1992 and held visiting appointments at the University of Western Australia (1974) and the Australian National University (1978). It was also during this time that Kingman developed the theory of the Coalescent or Coalescent theory, a backwards-in-time theory of individuals in historical populations that, because it greatly simplifies computation, underlies much of modern population genomics.

From October 1985, Kingman was elected Vice-Chancellor of the University of Bristol. He remained in Bristol until 2001 when he took up his post at the Isaac Newton Institute in Cambridge. Shortly after making that move, Kingman drew some media attention for having the third-highest salary among British Vice-Chancellors and this having nearly doubled in his final year in the job, at a time when most academics received pay-rises of about 3%. Whilst at Bristol, he also served in a number of other capacities. In the academic field, he was president of the Royal Statistical Society from 1987 to 1989, and president of the London Mathematical Society from 1990 to 1992. In public service, he was a member of the board of the British Council between 1986 and 1991 and was on the Board of the British Technology Group from 1986 until after it was privatised in 1992. He also held directorships at a number of industrial companies, including IBM from 1985 to 1995 and SmithKline Beecham from 1986 to 1989. In 1987–88, Kingman chaired the Committee of Inquiry into the teaching of the English language. In 2000 the Chancellor of the Exchequer appointed Sir John the first chairman of the Statistics Commission, the body that oversees the work of the Office for National Statistics, the UK government's statistics agency. In 2002 Kingman attracted some media attention
 by telling the House of Commons Treasury Select Committee that the 2011 UK Census could be conducted using new technology rather than the traditional headcount, or even not conducted at all.

Honors and awards
In 1985 Kingman was knighted by Queen Elizabeth II for his work with the Science and Engineering Research Council. Kingman holds honorary degrees from the University of Sussex, The University of Southampton, the University of Bristol, the University of the West of England, and Queen's University (Ontario). The London Mathematical Society awarded Kingman its Berwick Prize in 1967. Kingman was elected a Fellow of the Royal Society (FRS) in 1971, later receiving its Royal Medal in 1983 "[i]n recognition of his distinguished researches on queuing theory, on regenerative phenomena, and on mathematical genetics". He was also awarded the Guy Medal in silver by the Royal Statistical Society in 1981.

Personal life
He married Valerie Cromwell in 1964. They had two children, including John Oliver Frank Kingman. Lady Kingman died in 2018.

Bibliography

References

1939 births
Living people
Alumni of Pembroke College, Cambridge
English mathematicians
Wallis Professors of Mathematics
Fellows of Pembroke College, Cambridge
Fellows of the Royal Society
Knights Bachelor
English statisticians
Presidents of the Royal Statistical Society
Academics of the University of Bristol
People from Beckenham
Probability theorists
Vice-Chancellors of the University of Bristol
Royal Medal winners
Population geneticists
Queueing theorists
Members of Academia Europaea
Foreign associates of the National Academy of Sciences
N M Rothschild & Sons people
People educated at Christ's College, Finchley
Presidents of the European Mathematical Society
Biostatisticians
Mathematical statisticians